The Dying Daylights is the fourth studio album by Finnish gothic metal band Charon.

Track listing 

 "Failed" – 3:50
 "Religious/Delicious" – 3:26
 "Death Can Dance" – 3:41
 "In Brief War" – 3:49
 "Guilt on Skin" – 3:16
 "Unbreak, Unchain" – 5:21
 "Drive" – 3:36
 "Every Failure" – 4:45
 "In Trust of No One" – 3:03
 "If" – 3:32
 "No Saint" – 6:09
 "Built for My Ghosts" (digipak bonus track) – 3:42
 "Re-Collected" (digipak bonus track) – 3:50

Personnel

 Juha-Pekka "JP" Leppäluoto – vocals
 Pasi Sipilä – guitar
 Jasse von Hast – guitar
 Ant Karihtala – drums
 Teemu Hautamäki – bass

Production
 Recorded by Juha Matinheikki at BRR-studios, Raahe in spring 2003
 Mixed by Mikko Karmila at Finnvox-studios, Helsinki in July 2003
 Mastered by Minerva Pappi at Finnvox-studios, Helsinki in July 2003
 Cover artwork and design by Travis Smith

2003 albums
Charon (band) albums